Castle Quest may refer to:
Castlequest, a 1986 video game for the Famicom/NES consoles and MSX computer
Castle Quest (1985 video game), a 1985 video game for the BBC Micro
Castle Quest (1993 video game), a 1993 video game for the Game Boy